Michael Okoth Origi (born 16 November 1967) is a Kenyan retired footballer. Initially playing as a goalkeeper he converted to a striker at Shabana, a position that he would feature in for both club and country.

He spent most of his professional career in Belgium, while at international level he represented the Kenya national football team on 48 occasions between 1989 and 2004, scoring 17 goals. He is the father of Belgian international footballer, Divock Origi.

Club career
Okoth started his football career with Itierio Secondary School from where he was spotted by Shabana. He would feature for Shabana in the Kenyan Super League and at continental level in the African Champions Cup.

In 1992, he moved to Omani club Al Boshar and after the Africa Cup of Nations K.V. Oostende of the Belgian Second Division.

He would experience success with Racing Club Genk winning the 1998–99 Belgian First Division and the 1999-00 Belgian Cup.

Okoth would end his career in 2006 playing in the Belgian Third Division with K.S.K. Tongeren and later with Cobox 76.

International career
Okoth earned his first international call up in the 1989 CECAFA Cup turning out for a Kenya 'B' team.

He would represent the Harambee Stars in the Africa Cup of Nations in 1990, 1992 and 2004.

Personal life
Okoth is of Luo ethnicity. His older brother Austin "Makamu" Oduor Origi was a defender and captain for Gor Mahia and the Kenya national football team. His younger brothers would also feature in the Kenya Super League, Anthony Origi for Kenya Breweries and Gerald Origi for Utalii FC.

Arnold Origi, his nephew and son to Austin Oduor is a goalkeeper for Norwegian Tippeligaen side Lillestrøm and the Kenya national team.

His son Divock Origi is also a professional footballer.

References

External links
 

1967 births
Living people
People from Murang'a
Association football forwards
Kenyan footballers
Kenyan expatriate footballers
Kenyan expatriate sportspeople in Oman
Kenyan expatriate sportspeople in Belgium
Expatriate footballers in Oman
Expatriate footballers in Belgium
Tusker F.C. players
K.V. Oostende players
K.R.C. Genk players
R.W.D. Molenbeek players
K.R.C. Zuid-West-Vlaanderen players
K.S.K. Tongeren players
Belgian Pro League players
Challenger Pro League players
Kenya international footballers
1990 African Cup of Nations players
1992 African Cup of Nations players
2004 African Cup of Nations players
Shabana F.C. players